Danny Sleath (born 14 December 1986, in Matlock) is an English footballer who most recently played for Conference North side Tamworth, where he played as a midfielder.

Playing career

Mansfield Town
Born in Matlock, Derbyshire, Sleath is a graduate of the Mansfield Town youth academy and signed his first professional contract in the summer of 2006. During the 2006–07 season, Sleath was loaned out to Northern Premier League side Gresley Rovers, and later Conference North side Alfreton Town, to get first-team experience. After being recalled to his parent club, he made his first-team debut for Mansfield against Boston in March 2007, and was offered a new contract in May 2007. He joined Boston United on loan in November 2007, and then Gainsborough Trinity on loan in March 2008 until the end of the 2007–08 season. He was released by Mansfield at the end of the 2007–08 season.

Eastwood Town
After his release by Mansfield, he decided to pursue a career outside full-time professional football and enrolled at Loughborough University. He played for Northern Premier League Premier Division club Eastwood Town in September 2008.

Ilkeston Town
He spent the second half of the season with Ilkeston Town helping the club earn promotion.

Boston United
In July 2009, Sleath signed for Boston United, and helped them to their best run of results for 23 years during the 2009–10 season, as Boston won the Northern Premier League Challenge Cup and promotion. He also played in the final of the 2011 Summer Universiade for Great Britain during his time with Boston United.

Nuneaton Town
In June 2012 he joined Nuneaton Town.

Tamworth
On 9 June 2014 Sleath signed a contract with Conference North side Tamworth, and was joined at the club on the same day by former Nuneaton Town colleagues Kevin Thornton and David Hibbert.

Career statistics

References

External links

1986 births
Living people
People from Matlock, Derbyshire
Footballers from Derbyshire
English footballers
Association football midfielders
Mansfield Town F.C. players
Gresley F.C. players
Alfreton Town F.C. players
Boston United F.C. players
Gainsborough Trinity F.C. players
Eastwood Town F.C. players
Ilkeston Town F.C. (1945) players
Nuneaton Borough F.C. players
Tamworth F.C. players
English Football League players
National League (English football) players
Alumni of Loughborough University
Universiade silver medalists for Great Britain
Universiade medalists in football
Medalists at the 2011 Summer Universiade